The 1906–07 season was Burslem Port Vale's ninth consecutive season (13th overall) of football in the English Football League. The club resigned from the league on 14 June 1907.

On the pitch the team put in win or lose performances, and went for a club record 20 games – from 10 September 1906 to 19 January 1907 – without sharing the points (nine wins, eleven losses). Another record was set with a 7–1 win over Irthlingborough Town in the First Round of the FA Cup – their highest ever margin of victory in the competition.

The club folded at the end of the season after the chairman decided that the club had no viable future. However Cobridge Church immediately took on the name of Port Vale, and worked their way back to the Football League for the 1919–20 season.

Overview

Second Division
Despite the club's ever-worsening financial situation, Vale managed to bring back former top scorer, and former England international, Billy Beats; he was appointed captain upon his return. Gambling that big signings would attract big crowds, right-back Hughie Dunn was also brought in from Bristol Rovers; inside-right William Dodds signed from Southwick; with former player Tom Coxon returning from Middlesbrough. Sam Bennion took charge of team affairs after Tommy Clare's wages were too high to maintain.

The club started the season well, with three wins in their opening six games; 6,000 turning up for the opening game of the season. This was followed by four defeats on the bounce, but by winning five of their ten games in November and December the club put themselves in a decent position by Christmas. The club were two different sides at home and away, thumping Stockport County 5–0 at home and losing 6–0 at Burnley. Their first away win in ten months came at Blackpool on 22 December. They on to win just four league games in 1907, though did pick up points in the majority of their matches, going on a streak of six draws in ten games.

As had been the case in recent campaigns Vale just evaded a place in the re-election zones, finishing two points above the (potential) drop. For the second successive season the "Valeites" had the weakest defence in the league, conceding 83 goals in the league. Again they were poor on their travels, losing sixteen of their nineteen games away from home. Back at the Athletic Ground they lost just three games.

Billy Beats was top scorer with fifteen goals in all competitions; he was ably assisted by William Dodds, Tom Coxon, Robert Carter, and Harry Mountford, who all hit double figures. An extremely settled side, only nineteen players were used in the league, with Dodds a league ever-present.

Cup competitions
The club had a good campaign in the FA Cup, picking up their biggest ever win in the competition with a 7–1 trouncing of Irthlingborough Town. They took First Division Notts County to a replay in the Second Round, before losing comprehensively 5–0 at Trent Bridge. Nevertheless, both rounds attracted 10,000 supporters at Vale, a great boost to the club's ailing finances.

In the Staffordshire Senior Cup the club almost exclusively used their reserve players, but managed to reach the semi-finals, where they were knocked out by Aston Villa Reserves. To reach they semi-final they had to overcome struggling league rivals Burton United, though this took two replays to accomplish – a 7–0 romp followed 3–3 and 1–1 draws.

Financial collapse and closure
On 18 May 1907, Robert Audley and Sam Gleaves appealed to the directors to pump more money into the club, and appealed in The Sentinel for local supporters to donate. This appeal was met with resounding indifference and so the club resigned from the Football League on 14 June 1907. The Football Association had already issued their fixture list (which had pitted Port Vale against relegated Stoke for the first time) and were furious with the club for quitting so suddenly at such a late stage.

Robert Audley justified the decision to quit the league by pointing out that the season's £200 loss was as good a figure as could be expected in the future, with the past seven campaigns taking in an average of £1,500, supplemented by an average of £400 in transfer takings. He claimed "this total could not be expected to pay the expenses of a league club", especially with creditors closing in, the bank refusing an overdraft, and summer wages to be paid. That so few came forward to help the club in its time of need came to be the final straw for Audley.

Many of the players joined Stoke, as well as newly elected Oldham Athletic, and Burslem Port Vale was finished.

Cobridge Church
Port Vale's history would have ended at this point, had it not been for an unexpected twist. North Staffordshire Church League champions Cobridge Church were accepted into the North Staffordshire Federation League, still a very minor league. Joint-secretaries Millward and E.C.Brundrett had very big ambitions however. They sought permission from the Football Association to change the club's name to Port Vale and bought the old club's ground. To signify their roots they renamed their reserve side to Cobridge Church. Technically the Port Vale of before 1907 was a separate entity to the Port Vale of after 1907, however spiritually the club continued its existence from its 1876 founding onwards. In December 1908, a group of ex-directors, led by Sam Bennion, bought into the club, meaning that the new club played at the same ground, had similar owners, a similar name, and played continuously from 1906–07 to 1907–08 and beyond.

League table

Results
Burslem Port Vale's score comes first

Football League Second Division

Results by matchday

Matches

FA Cup

Staffordshire Senior Cup

Player statistics

Appearances

Top scorers

Transfers

Transfers in

Transfers out

References
Specific

General

Port Vale F.C. seasons
Burslem Port Vale